The National Security Commission on Emerging Biotechnology (NSCEB) is a United States bipartisan, intergovernmental body created by the National Defense Authorization Act for Fiscal Year 2022 (Sec. 1091).

"The National Security Commission on Emerging Biotechnology will conduct a thorough review of how advances in emerging biotechnology and related technologies will shape current and future activities of the Department of Defense, provide an interim report to the President of the United States and the Armed Services Committees within one year, and submit a final unclassified report within two years to the President and the committees, including recommendations for action by Congress and the federal government."

The National Security Commission on Emerging Biotechnology was announced in March, 2022 and is charged with issuing a final report by March, 2024.

The NSCEB is composed of 12 commissioners, and those currently appointed include:

 Senator Alex Padilla (D-CA)
 Senator Todd Young (R-IN)
 Representative Ro Khanna (D-CA)
 Representative Stephanie Bice (R-OK)
 The Honorable Dov S. Zakheim - former Under Secretary of Defense (Comptroller)
 Mr. Paul Arcangeli - Professional staff on the House Armed Services Committee of 18 years
 Dr. Jason Kelly - Co-Founder and CEO or Ginkgo Bioworks
 Dr. Alexander Titus - VP of Strategy at Colossal Biosciences and former Assistant Director for Biotechnology in the Office of the Under Secretary of Defense for Research and Engineering
 Dr. Eric Schmidt - Billionaire philanthropist and former CEO of Google

Three additional commissioners are still to be announced.

References 

Biotechnology in the United States